Andar is a Community development block and a town in Siwan district of Bihar in India. It is one out of 13 blocks of Siwan Subdivision. The headquarter of the block is located in Andar town.

Andar block is divided into many villages and they are grouped into Gram Panchayats. South Road from Andar goes to Raghunathpur, through Gherai more &  from Gherai more east direction road goes to Hasanpur. 

From Andar Bazar also and from Gherai more west direction road leads to Ashaw Bazar. 

From Andar Bazar west direction Andar block and police station (Thana) is situated. 

Andar is having very beautiful market where people gets all needful materials for our daily life.

Gram Panchayats
List of Panchayats in Andar Block:
 Andar (Nagar Panchayat)
 Arkpur
 Asaon
 Balia
 Bhawrajpur
 Jaijor
 Jamalpur
 Kherhai
 Manpur Pateji
 Patar
 Sahsaraon

See also
 Siwan Subdivision
 Administration in Bihar

External links
 www.censusindia.co.in

References

Community development blocks in Siwan district